Johan Andreas Holvik (May 19, 1880 – November 25, 1960) was a Norwegian-American author and a professor at Concordia College in Moorhead, Minnesota.

Background
Johan Andreas Holvik was born in Miner County, near Howard, South Dakota to immigrants Peder Holvik and Eli Jonsdatter from Nordfjord, Norway. Holvik attended Madison State Normal School in Madison, South Dakota. He graduated from St. Olaf College in Northfield, Minnesota (BA. 1907). He subsequently studied at the University of Oslo and at Luther Theological Seminary in St. Paul, Minnesota. Holvik graduated from St. Olaf College (MA. 1913).

Career
Holvik was a Faculty Member of the Norwegian Department at St. Olaf College during 1907–1908. Holvik taught at Waldorf College in Forest City, Iowa from 1913 until 1919. Holvik relocated to Concordia College in 1923. Holvik was an author of several textbooks dealing with the Norwegian language. In addition to teaching in the Norwegian department, Holvik also served as Concordia College band director for twenty-two years. He had the privilege of leading the college band on a tour of Norway during 1935.

In 1925, Holvik served as the secretary of national administration committee of the Norse-American Centennial. Holvik was subsequently knighted by King Haakon VII of Norway as a member of the Royal Norwegian Order of St. Olav. Additional he served as the translator of a number of books which were originally written in the Norwegian language. These included works by both Bjørnstjerne Bjørnson and Henrik Ibsen.

Holvik also became involved in the national debate over the authenticity of the Kensington runestone. Holvik had participated in the Minnesota Historical Society investigation in 1910. Holvik formulated several key arguments used by those who contested the stone's authenticity. UCLA professor Erik Wahlgren, referenced many of Holvik's ideas in his 1958 book The Kensington Stone: A Mystery Solved.

Personal life
Holvik married Caroline Heltne in Lake Mills, Iowa on April 12, 1912. Holvik died in November 1960. He is buried on the campus of Concordia College.

Selected works
 Beginners' Book in Norse (Minneapolis, Minn.  Augsburg Publishing House. 1910)
 Second Book in Norse: Literary Selections (Minneapolis, Minn. Augsburg Pub. House. 1912)

References

Other sources
 Wahlgren, Erik The Kensington Stone: A Mystery Solved (1958)

External links
 
 Johan Andreas Holvik, Photograph ca. 1923
 Inventory of his papers at the Minnesota Historical Society

1880 births
1960 deaths
People from Howard, South Dakota
St. Olaf College alumni
St. Olaf College faculty
American people of Norwegian descent
American Lutherans
Linguists from the United States
Writers from Minnesota
Writers from South Dakota
Waldorf University
People from Forest City, Iowa
20th-century linguists
20th-century Lutherans